James Little may refer to:

 James Little (American politician), Wisconsin State Assemblyman
 James Little (British politician) (1868–1946), unionist politician in Northern Ireland
 James Little (physician) (1837–1916), Irish physician
 James-Little Ecological Reserve
 Jimmy Little (1937–2012), Australian Aboriginal musician, singer and songwriter
 Jim Little (businessman), CEO of Ottawa Senators, 2020
 Jimmy Little (carpenter) (born 1976), carpenter, stagehand and TV personality
 James Little (shepherd) (1834–1921), New Zealand shepherd and sheep breeder
 James Lewis Little (1871–1967), schooner captain and politician in Newfoundland
 James Little (painter) (born 1952), American painter

See also
 Allan Little (born 1959), former BBC researcher and reporter